The Western Oregon Wolves (also WOU Wolves) are the athletic teams that represent Western Oregon University, located in Monmouth, Oregon, in intercollegiate sports as a member of the Division II level of the National Collegiate Athletic Association (NCAA), primarily competing in the Great Northwest Athletic Conference (GNAC) since the 2001–02 academic year. The Wolves previously competed in the D-II Pacific West Conference (PacWest) from 1998–99 to 2000–01; and in the Cascade Collegiate Conference (CCC) of the National Association of Intercollegiate Athletics (NAIA) from 1993–94 to 1997–98 (although they remained in the CCC as an affiliate member for some sports from 1998–99 to 1999–2000).

Varsity teams
Western Oregon competes in 12 intercollegiate varsity sports: Men's sports include baseball, basketball, cross country, football, soccer and track & field; while women's sports include basketball, cross country, soccer, softball, track & field and volleyball.

Softball
On April 26, 2008, Sara Tucholsky, a reserve outfielder on the Wolves softball team (2005–08), hit the first home run of her college career in a victory over Central Washington University, but injured her knee rounding first base; Central Washington's Mallory Holtman and Liz Wallace carried Tucholsky around the rest of the bases to home plate.  This act of sportsmanship was heavily covered by national media outlets, and resulted in Tucholsky, Holtman, and Wallace's winning the Best Moment award at the 2008 ESPY Awards.

The Wolves softball team appeared in one Women's College World Series in 1975.

Club sports
Pertaining to club sports on campus, not regulated by the NCAA or NAIA, the Western Oregon Men's Lacrosse Club has won the Division II PNCLL championship trophy in 2008, 2009, 2010, 2011 and 2012. The Western Oregon Men's Soccer club won the Division II CCSL (Cascade Collegiate Soccer League) Championship in 2012, led by Nathan Tew who also was a member of the 2015 Football Team as a backup kicker.

National Award Winners

Notable athletes

Kevin Boss, former NFL tight end for the New York Giants, Oakland Raiders and Kansas City Chiefs
Dan Straily (born 1988), starting pitcher in the Philadelphia Phillies organization
Tyrell Williams, NFL Wide Receiver for the Detroit Lions. Former NFL teams, Oakland Raiders and San Diego Chargers.

References

External links